Larisa Savina is a Russian former footballer who played mainly for CSK VVS Samara and Lada Togliatti in the Russian Championship, also playing the European Cup with Lada. She was a member of the Russian national team through the 1990s, taking part in the 1997 European Championship and the 1999 World Cup. She scored one goal in each tournament.

Honours

Titles
 4 Russian Leagues (1993, 1994, 1996, 2004)
 3 Russian Cup (1994, 2001, 2004)
 1 Italy Women's Cup (2005)

References

1970 births
Living people
People from Karaganda Region
Soviet women's footballers
Russian women's footballers
Russia women's international footballers
1999 FIFA Women's World Cup players
CSK VVS Samara (women's football club) players
FC Lada Togliatti (women) players
Women's association football forwards